Kerbal Space Program 2 is a space flight simulation video game developed by Intercept Games and published by Private Division. It is the sequel to 2011's Kerbal Space Program and was released for early access on February 24, 2023, for Windows, with releases for PlayStation 5 and Xbox Series X/S planned for after early access.

Gameplay
This sequel builds on the sandbox features of its predecessor Kerbal Space Program, while at the same time has plans of introducing new propulsion methods (e.g. the Orion drive), habitation modules for building on-surface, orbital and planetary colonies, a multiplayer mode, as well as interstellar travel.

Development
Kerbal Space Program 2 was announced at Gamescom 2019 on August 19, with an initial release date set for early 2020. The game was in development by Star Theory Games, formerly Uber Entertainment, which changed its name in order to display a stronger association with the Kerbal Space Program franchise. Development was shifted to Star Theory in part so that Squad could focus on developing further updates for the original game. To ensure that the experience felt "grounded", the team consulted a panel of scientists and experts including Dr. Uri Shumlak, the associate chair of the University of Washington's Aeronautics and Astronautics department, Scott Manley, an astrophysicist and YouTuber that has made videos on Kerbal Space Program, and Dr. Joel Green, also an astrophysicist. Kerbal Space Program received feedback that the game was too overwhelming for new players. Therefore, the team has stated that they aim to make the game more accessible by introducing more tutorials in order to give more guidance to players and ensure they understand the game's various systems.

For various reasons, the release date was pushed back to Q3 2021. Take-Two established a new unnamed studio under Private Division to continue development of Kerbal Space Program 2, with some of Star Theory's employees brought into it, leaving it unclear what Star Theory's role remains on the title. Later reporting by Bloomberg revealed that Take-Two was in talks to acquire Star Theory but abruptly changed course, set up a new studio to develop the game (Intercept Games), and then poached a third of Star Theory's developers including the creative director and the lead producer. Star Theory closed its doors three months later. It was announced in August 21 that Squad, the developer of the original Kerbal Space Program, will also be involved in the sequel's development.

In November 2020, creative director Nate Simpson announced that the release date was delayed again to 2022. In June 2021, it was announced via the game's official Twitter account that the game would also be launching on the PlayStation 5 and Xbox Series X/S in 2022. In May 2022, a delay to early 2023 was announced.

In October 2022, an early access date of February 24, 2023, was announced. Private Division and Intercept Games also published a roadmap detailing future development. Early Access will aim to have all the features and content of the original Kerbal Space Program, but with an improved user experience, new parts, and improved tutorials. Future developments will add science, colonies, interstellar travel, multiplayer, improved exploration and resource gathering. The game is also set to be released for PlayStation 5 and Xbox Series X and Series S in the future.

Reception 
Player feedback for the Early Access release of Kerbal Space Program 2 has been mixed. Some players criticized the game for its poor technical performance and lack of content at launch, others have praised its improved graphics, quality-of-life changes, or view it as a work in progress.

References

External links
 

Open-world video games
PlayStation 4 games
PlayStation 5 games
Single-player video games
Space flight simulator games
Private Division games
Upcoming video games scheduled for 2023
Video games about extraterrestrial life
Video games developed in the United States
Video games set on fictional planets
Video games with user-generated gameplay content
Windows games
Xbox One games
Xbox Series X and Series S games
Video games postponed due to the COVID-19 pandemic
Video game sequels
Video games set in outer space